Rodrigo Gracie (born March 11, 1974) is a retired Brazilian mixed martial artist and Brazilian Jiu-Jitsu practitioner. A member of the famous Gracie family, Rodrigo is a 6th Degree Black Belt in Gracie Jiu-Jitsu and a Gold Medalist in the 1998 ADCC Submission Wrestling World Championship. While competing in PRIDE Fighting Championships, Gracie was ranked amongst the top Middleweight fighters from 2003 to 2004 due to an undefeated streak with consecutive victories over Hayato Sakurai, Daiju Takase, Yuki Sasaki, and Daijiro Matsui.

Biography 
A member of the Gracie family of Brazil. He is the son of Jiu-Jitsu Grandmaster Reylson Gracie and grandson of the founder of Gracie Jiu-Jitsu, Carlos Gracie. Rodrigo began training Jiu-Jitsu at the age of 4 and was awarded the black belt at the age of 18 under his father. He then came to the United States to teach at his father's academy in California. A few years later, he went to New York City to train and work with his cousin  Renzo Gracie.

Looking for new challenges and opportunities Rodrigo moved to Los Angeles, California where he was welcomed by his cousin Royce Gracie. Rodrigo and Royce have started to train together as well as spend a lot of time as a family. Gracie is the head instructor at the Rodrigo Gracie Academy in Palos Verdes, California. Rodrigo also travels conducting seminars all over the world and in some of the  "Royce Gracie Jiu-Jitsu Networks".

Books 
Gracie has co-written three instructional books on Brazilian jiu-jitsu with author Kid Peligro; “Brazilian Jiu-Jitsu No Holds Barred!: Fighting Techniques”, “Brazilian Jiu-Jitsu: The Path to the Black Belt”, and “The Complete Guide to Gracie Jiu-Jitsu”.

Championships and accomplishments

Submission grappling
ADCC Submission Wrestling World Championship
ADCC Submission Wrestling World Championship Gold Medalist - 1998
North American Grappling Association
4-Time North American Grappling Association Champion
 Brazilian Jiu Jitsu 
5th Degree Black Belt in Gracie Jiu Jitsu

Mixed martial arts
PRIDE Fighting Championships
Undefeated in PRIDE Fighting Championships (4-0)
K-1 Heros
Hero's 2006 Light Heavyweight Grand Prix Quarterfinalist
MARS Japan
MARS World Grand Prix Finalist

Mixed martial arts record 

|-
|Loss
|align=center|6–2–1
|OyamaShungo Oyama
| Decision (majority) 
| Hero's 6
|
|align=center|2
|align=center|5:00
|Tokyo, Japan
|
|-
| Draw
|align=center|6–1–1
|Hidetaka Monma
| Draw
| MARS World Grand Prix
|
|align=center|3
|align=center|5:00
|Tokyo, Japan
|
|-
|Win
|align=center|6–1
|KuniokuKiuma Kunioku
| Decision (unanimous)
| Hero's 2
|
|align=center|2
|align=center|5:00
|Tokyo, Japan
|
|-
|Loss
|align=center|5–1
|PennB.J. Penn
| Decision (unanimous) 
|Rumble on the Rock 6
|
|align=center|3
|align=center|5:00
|Honolulu, Hawaii, United States
|
|-
|Win
|align=center|5–0
|SakuraiHayato Sakurai
| Decision (unanimous)  	 
|PRIDE Bushido 2
|
|align=center|2
|align=center|5:00
|Yokohama, Japan
|
|-
|Win
|align=center|4–0
|TakaseDaiju Takase
| Decision (unanimous)
| PRIDE Bushido 1
|
|align=center|2
|align=center|5:00
|Saitama, Saitama, Japan
|
|-
|Win
|align=center|3–0
|SasakiYuki Sasaki
| Decision (split)
|PRIDE 24 
|
|align=center|3
|align=center|5:00
|Fukuoka Prefecture, Japan
|
|-
|Win
|align=center|2–0
|MatsuiDaijiro Matsui
| Technical Submission (guillotine choke)
|PRIDE 19
|
|align=center|3
|align=center|0:28
|Saitama, Saitama, Japan
|
|-
|Win
|align=center|1–0
|DeMelloKyle DeMello 
| Submission (arm-triangle choke)
|Vengeance at the Vanderbilt 10
|
|align=center|1
|align=center|0:34
|Plainview, New York, United States
|

References

External links

Rodrigo Gracie Official Website

Living people
1975 births
Brazilian male mixed martial artists
Middleweight mixed martial artists
Mixed martial artists utilizing Brazilian jiu-jitsu
Brazilian jiu-jitsu trainers
Sportspeople from Rio de Janeiro (city)
Brazilian people of Scottish descent
Rodrigo
People awarded a black belt in Brazilian jiu-jitsu
People from Palos Verdes, California